Owen Aaronovitch (born 1956) is a British actor, known for portraying Jon Lindsay in Coronation Street.

Background
Aaronovitch was born in Parliament Hill, London. He is the son of the late economist and communist Sam Aaronovitch, and brother of the journalist David Aaronovitch and writer Ben Aaronovitch. Aaronovitch attended Dame Alice Owen's School in Islington, and at the age of eighteen moved to Newcastle to study creative arts.

Aaronovitch is married to actress Fiona Bruce, with whom he has two children, Frankie and Ruben. It is often falsely reported on fan websites that Aaronovitch's wife is the newsreader and Antiques Roadshow presenter, Fiona Bruce. This is false. His wife, of the same name, is an actress and teaches drama along with her husband.

Acting career
Aaronovitch made his professional debut at the Belgrade Theatre in Coventry. His theatre work includes The Great Gatsby, The Hunchback of Notre Dame, Pinocchio, The Waltz and Red Dust Blue Dreams.

Aaronovitch played the role of fake airline pilot Jon Lindsay, the con man responsible for Deirdre Rashid's imprisonment, in Coronation Street from 1997 to 1998. He also did a drag parody of this role, as a drag character called Jean Lindsay on Harry Hill.

His other television credits include Prime Suspect, A Touch of Frost, Reckless, The Bill and Doctors.

Aaronovitch also portrayed Olag Gan in the 2006 audio revival of Blake's 7.

Filmography

References

External links

1956 births
Living people
English Jews
English male soap opera actors
English male stage actors
English male voice actors
English people of Irish descent
English people of Jewish descent
Jewish English male actors
Male actors from London
People educated at Dame Alice Owen's School
People from Camden Town